Eugoa trifasciella is a moth of the family Erebidae. It is found in Sri Lanka.

Description
Head, thorax and abdomen greyish or brownish fuscous. Thorax spotted with black. Forewings greyish, irrorated with fuscous and a black spot at base. There is a slightly diffused angled antemedial band which are narrower. Two obliquely placed black spots at end of cell. Forewings with veins 4 and 5 stalked and vein 11 anastomosing with vein 12. Hindwings pale ochreous suffused with fuscous. Hindwings without vein 5.

References
Notes

Sources
 

trifasciella
Moths described in 1922